Ambres may refer to:

 Ambres, a commune of the Tarn department in southern France
 Ambres (Narcea), a parish in Cangas del Narcea, Spain
 Chip Ambres (born 1979), American Major League Baseball player